Glow is the 8th studio album, and 9th overall by Rick James, released in 1985 on the Gordy Records imprint of Motown Records.

It peaked at #50 on the Billboard album chart.

Critical reception
The Rolling Stone Album Guide wrote that James had "[run] out of ideas," describing the album as a "waste."

Track listing
All tracks composed and arranged by Rick James.

Side A
"Can't Stop"
"Spend the Night with Me"
"Melody Make Me Dance"
"Somebody (The Girl's Got)"

Side B
"Glow"
"Moonchild"
"Sha La La La La (Come Back Home)"
"Rock and Roll Control"
"Glow (Reprise)"

2014 digital remaster bonus tracks
 Glow / Glow (Reprise) - 6:59
 Spend The Night With Me (12" Extended Version) - 7:20
 17 - 6:44
 Oh What A Night (4 Luv) - 5:05
 You Turn Me On - 4:42

2014 Complete Motown Albums bonus tracks
 Glow / Glow (Reprise) - 6:59
 Glow (12" Instrumental) - 8:20 
 Spend The Night With Me (12" Extended Version) - 7:20
 Spend The Night With Me (12" Instrumental) - 7:33
 Can't Stop (Instrumental) - 6:13
 17 - 6:44
 17 (12" Instrumental) - 5:40
 Oh What A Night (4 Luv) - 5:05
 You Turn Me On - 4:42 
 You Turn Me On (12" Long Version) - 5:30
 You Turn Me On (12" Long Version Instrumental) - 5:33

Personnel
Backing Vocals – Greg Levias, LaMorris Payne, Levi Ruffin Jr., Maxwell Karmason, Val Young
Bass – Jerry Livingston, Rick James
Drums – Steve Ferrone, Lanise Hughes
Flute – Daniel LeMelle
Guitar – Kenny Hawkins, Rick James, Tom McDermott
Harmonica – Rick James
Keyboards – Rick James
Percussion – Nate Hughes, Rick James
Piano – Greg Levias
Saxophone – Daniel LeMelle
Strings – Levi Ruffin Jr.
Synthesizer – Daniel LeMelle, Greg Levias, Levi Ruffin Jr.
Vocoder – Rick James

References

1985 albums
Rick James albums
Albums produced by Rick James
Gordy Records albums

sv:Glöd